A reanimated collaboration (often shortened to reanimated collab or reanimate) is a type of collaborative fan-made animation project wherein each animator recreates one shot of an existing film in their own style. The individual works are then stitched into the original order and published on the internet as a completed collaboration, creating a collaborative tribute to the original film. This differs from a shot-for-shot recreation, as the goal of a reanimate is to display each of the independent animators' unique stylings rather than to produce a unified or identical result. Multiple collaborations focus on media made a decade or more prior that receives renewed interest due to internet memes, nostalgia, or the death of a voice actor. As they are often non-profit tributes to an existing work, animators expect to receive little or no profit.

Notable examples 
 Moon Animate Make-Up! (2014) — Over 250 animators collaborated to reanimate the 38th episode of the Sailor Moon anime series, "Fractious Friends" (1993). This project is considered to be the first major reanimated internet-collaboration, and eventually led to this style of video increasing in popularity during the late 2010s. As of 2022, the collaboration has over 2.75 million views.

 Mama Luigi Project (2017) — 227 animators reanimated the 11-minute Super Mario World episode "Mama Luigi" (1991). Each of the 255 total scenes featured a different animation style. It was dedicated to the memories of Canadian actor Tony Rosato, who voiced Luigi, and Canadian actor Harvey Atkin, who voiced King Koopa. This project ultimately generated a resurgence of popularity in reanimated collaborations. The video has 6 million views as of 2022.

 Steamed Hams but There's a Different Animator Every 13 Seconds (2018) — Andrew Kepple of Albino Blacksheep hosted the project, which reanimated "Steamed Hams," a memorable sequence from the 1996 The Simpsons episode "22 Short Films about Springfield," that had a surge in popularity in 2018 due to YouTube Poop internet memes. As of 2022, the video has over 10 million views.

 Shrek Retold (2018) — A reanimated collab fan film in which over 200 animators, songwriters, and voice actors recreated Shrek (2001). 3GI is best known for organizing the Shrek-themed festival "Shrekfest" in Milwaukee, WI, held annually since 2014. The reanimated collab contains mediums including 2D animation, 3D animation, live action, and stop-motion. Collaborators included David Liebe Hart, Michael Cusack, Ratboy Genius, Anthony Fantano, and SiIvaGunner. In March 2020, Shrek Retold was followed up by Sonic Rebuilt, a similar recreation of the 1999 Sonic the Hedgehog film.

 Kirby Reanimated Collab (2019) — Featuring over 300 artists, the project recreated Kirby Right Back at Ya! episode 49, "Cartoon Buffoon" (2002). The project was directed by Roya Shahidi, and it has received over 3 million views as of 2022. The project was taken down due to DMCA copyright claims multiple times, despite Nintendo claiming it was not behind the takedowns.

 The Zelda CDi Reanimated Collab! (2020) — PatchToons hosted and released a 21-minute collaboration that recreated the cutscenes of The Legend of Zelda CDi games (1989-1996), which renewed interest in the games' infamous YouTube Poop popularity. Over 200 animators collaborated on the project. Nintendo Wire reported, "The ever-shifting mediums and the contrasting animation styles, ranging from professional and sophisticated to intentionally goofy and exaggerated, lend themselves incredibly well to cutscenes that were already chaotic and bizarre to begin with." It was also uploaded to animation website Newgrounds.

 The SpongeBob SquarePants Movie: Rehydrated! (2022) — A collaboration fan film between over 300 artists that recreated The SpongeBob SquarePants Movie as a tribute to late SpongeBob creator Stephen Hillenburg, who died of ALS in 2018. Similarly to Shrek Retold, the audio was re-dubbed and re-instrumented specifically to bypass YouTube's copyright restrictions. Despite this, the video was taken down due to a copyright claim from Paramount within an hour of the video's premiere. This takedown outraged fans and participants of the project, leading to the Twitter hashtag, #JusticeForSpongebob. The video has since been restored to YouTube and has over 2 million views as of 2022.

 Shrek 2 Retold (TBA) — An upcoming collaboration fan film that was originally, on April 1, 2019, 3GI posted an April Fools video titled Shrek 2 Retold in which the project director discussed the creation of Shrek Retold. During Shrekfest 2019 it was announced that Shrek 2 Retold was no longer just a joke and is actually happening via an animated announcement trailer. The Shrek 2 Retold Twitter posts public updates about the project. On April 22, 2021, as a celebration of the twentieth anniversary of the original film, 3GI posted an official teaser trailer of Shrek 2 Retold.

See also 

 Comic jam
 Exquisite corpse
 Experimental animation
 YouTube Poop
 Fan film

References 

Animation
Collaborative projects
Collaboration
Internet-based works
Film and video terminology
Fan films